The Italy national korfball team is managed by the Federazione Italiana Korfball (FIK), representing Italy in korfball international competitions. 

In 2005 Italy won the Mediterranean Cup, consisting in a double match with Greece, being their first matches ever.

Tournament History

Current squad
National team in the 2009 European Bowl

 Coach: Massimo Cereda

References

National korfball teams
Korfball
National team